Willowbrook was an English bus bodybuilder. Founded in 1927, it acquired the business of Stokes & Holt, Leicester. In 1952 it acquired a patent from Brush Traction to build metal-framed bodies. Sold to Duple Coachbuilders in September 1958, and then in a management buyout in 1971, it ceased in 1983.

References

External links

Companies based in Loughborough
Defunct bus manufacturers of the United Kingdom
Vehicle manufacturing companies established in 1927
Vehicle manufacturing companies disestablished in 1983
1927 establishments in England
1983 disestablishments in England